The Muslims cricket team was an Indian first-class cricket team which took part in the annual Bombay tournament.  The team was founded by members of the Muslim community in Bombay.

The Muslims joined the Bombay tournament in 1912, when they accepted an invitation from the Europeans, Hindus and Parsees to expand the competition, which was renamed the Bombay Quadrangular.

The Muslims had a strong team during the last decade or so of the tournament's existence, winning the title six times between 1934–35 and 1944-45.

External links
 First-class matches played by Muslims at CricketArchive

Sources
 Vasant Raiji, India's Hambledon Men, Tyeby Press, 1986
 Mihir Bose, A History of Indian Cricket, Andre-Deutsch, 1990
 Ramachandra Guha, A Corner of a Foreign Field - An Indian History of a British Sport, Picador, 2001

Indian first-class cricket teams
Former senior cricket clubs of India